For Sale: Live at Maxwell's 1986 is a 2017 live album by the American alternative rock band The Replacements. Recorded at the famous Maxwell's at the height of the band's commercial and creative arc, it is one of the few good recordings of their live performances. The band's only previous live album—1985's The Shit Hits the Fans—was a limited cassette tape release which features poor audio quality and several false starts and stops on songs. In 2007, bassist Tommy Stinson stated that "There are no good Replacements live recordings", in part due to a lack of high-quality recordings and in part due to the band's notoriously sloppy performances due to alcohol abuse. The album was produced by Bob Mehr, who wrote the 2016 biography of the band Trouble Boys: The True Story of the Replacements.

Recording
The album was recorded with a mobile recording studio as an attempt to market the band by Seymour Stein of Sire/Warner Bros. Records but was canceled after guitarist Bob Stinson left the band a few months later.

Track listing
All songs written by Paul Westerberg, except where noted.

Disc one
"Hayday"
"Color Me Impressed"
"Dose of Thunder" (Chris Mars, Tommy Stinson, Paul Westerberg) 
"Fox on the Run" (Brian Connolly, Steve Priest, Andy Scott, Mick Tucker)
"Hold My Life"
"I Will Dare"
"Favorite Thing" (Paul Westerberg, Tommy Stinson, Bob Stinson, Chris Mars)
"Unsatisfied"
"Can't Hardly Wait"
"Tommy Gets His Tonsils Out" (Paul Westerberg, Tommy Stinson, Bob Stinson, Chris Mars)
"Takin' a Ride"
"Bastards of Young"
"Kiss Me on the Bus"
"Black Diamond" (Paul Stanley)

Disc two
"Johnny's Gonna Die"
"Otto"
"I'm in Trouble"
"Left of the Dial"
"God Damn Job"
"Answering Machine"
"Waitress in the Sky"
"Take Me Down to the Hospital"
"Gary's Got a Boner" (Paul Westerberg, Tommy Stinson, Bob Stinson, Chris Mars, Ted Nugent)
"If Only You Were Lonely"
"Baby Strange" (Marc Bolan)
"Hitchin' a Ride" (Peter Callander, Mitch Murray)
"Nowhere Man" (John Lennon, Paul McCartney)
"Go"
"Fuck School" (Paul Westerberg, Tommy Stinson, Bob Stinson, Chris Mars)

Charts

References

External links
Preview of "Can't Hardly Wait" by Rhino Records on SoundCloud

2017 live albums
Rhino Records live albums
The Replacements (band) live albums